The Goldener Hahn, also known as the Golden Cockerel, is a ceremonial wine goblet on display in the Historical City Hall of Münster. The goblet is gifted for use by important guests of the city, and its shape pays homage to the history of Münster, Germany.

Design 
The goblet is a gilded silver vessel shaped in the form of a cockerel. According to Münsterian legend, a cockerel saved the city when a rooster flew to a high point in the city, an act which caused a besieging army (which had been attempting to starve the city into submission)   to lose hope that the city could be easily taken. As such, cockerels became strongly associated with the history of the city. The goblet itself was created in the 17th century in Nuremberg, Germany and given as a gift to Münster. The goblet, which holds one bottle of wine, is offered to important guests of the city. The goblet is currently on display in the Historical City Hall of Münster.

References 

Chalices
Silver objects
Drinkware